Allocnemis pauli is a species of white-legged damselfly in the family Platycnemididae. It is found in the Democratic Republic of the Congo, Kenya, Nigeria, and Uganda. Its natural habitats are subtropical or tropical moist lowland forests, rivers, intermittent rivers, and freshwater springs.

The IUCN conservation status of Allocnemis pauli is "LC", least concern, with no immediate threat to the species' survival. The IUCN status was reviewed in 2016.

References

Further reading

 

Platycnemididae
Articles created by Qbugbot
Insects described in 1936